Year of the Rain is a 2010 Taiwanese television series. The director of the TV series is Chen Hui Ling. It is co-produced by Vanness Wu.

Introduction
Year of the Rain is the first TV series about the Typhoon Morakot disaster that happened in August, 2009 in Taiwan. It was directed by the director of Autumn's Concerto, Chen Hui Ling, and produced by singer/actor Vanness Wu. This was his first production. The main actors are Jian Man Shu and Zhang Shu Hao. It also features Liu Shui-Chi, Isa Hsieh, Yu An-shun and Ding Qiang.

Year of the Rain was created by the production team of Autumn's Concerto. There are 6 episodes.

Castt

Main Characters

Other Characters

Awards and nominations

Awards

2010: 45th Golden Bell Awards:
 Drama program guide (director) Award - Chen Hui Ling
 Channel Advertising Award

Nominations

2010: 45th Golden Bell Awards:
 Drama program Award
 Best Actress Award for drama programs – Jian Man Shu
 Drama program for best supporting actress – Ke Shu Qin
 Drama programs Screenplay Award

Other

OST
 Open (Soundtrack)
 Rush Memory (Soundtrack)
 Father's song -Piano solo (Soundtrack)
 Leaving (Soundtrack)
 Yu Mei Ting Guo (Theme Song)
 Hao Xiang
 Oh Love
 A Thousand Wind

DVD
 Name: Year of the Rain 3 DVD+ CD
 Issuing Company: Public Television Service
 Date: 2010/08/13
 Category: Video
 Total disc: 4
 Information About The Videos
 Running Time: 531 minutes
 Director: Chen Hui Ling
 Main Characters: Jian Man Shu, Zhang Shu Hao, Zhang Jie, Ke Shu Qin, Wu Peng Feng, Xie Qiong Nuan, Su Bing Xian
 Capacities: 2 discs of DVD5, 1 disc of DVD9, 1 CD
 Subtitles: Chinese
 Audio: Dolby 5.1

Songs
 Title
 Open
 Rush Memory
 Dropping Silence
 Father's Song (Quartets version)
 Water Girl
 Little Stars (Big Band version)
 Conflict
 Father's Song (Piano Solo)
 Mother
 Mother and Girl
 Memory
 Pray
 Encounter
 Leaving
 Fruit Store
 Father's Song (Sax and Strings)
 Father's Song (Big Band)
 A Thousand Winds (Big Band)
 Coda

Film Locations
 Datong High School, Taipei
 Sihjiaoting Station
 Wai-ao Station
 228 Peace Memorial Park
 Lighthouse San-Diao-Jiao 
 Siaolin, Kaohsiung
 Country Road 102 :zh:縣道102號
 KHS, Fu-Xing Store
 The Yuanshan Veterans Hospital
 The Gongliao old bridge
 Gongliao Old Street
 Yonghe Sijhou market
 Ximending

References

External links
 Year of the Rain Official Site 
 Lighthouse San-Diao-Jiao 

Taiwanese television series